Gigauri is a Georgian surname. It may refer to
Davit Gigauri (born 1994), Georgian rugby union player
Eka Gigauri (born 1978), public figure and a civic activist
George Gigauri, UN official and senior humanitarian
Merab Gigauri (born 1993), Georgian football player
Revaz Gigauri (born 1984), Georgian rugby union player 
Vladimir Gigauri (1934–2006), renowned Georgian-born Soviet scientist

Georgian-language surnames
Surnames of Georgian origin